Extraskeletal Ewing sarcoma (EES), is a cancer of soft tissue, a type of Ewing sarcoma that does not arise from bone.

Signs and symptoms
It belongs to the Ewing family of tumors. Typical symptoms include pain at the site of the tumor. It can occur in a wide range of parts of the body. It grows rapidly, with the upper leg, upper arms, bottom and shoulders being the most common sites to be affected. At presentation, a quarter of cases have already spread; typically to lungs, bone and bone marrow.

Diagnosis
Diagnosis is by medical imaging, with MRI being more accurate than CT scan, and confirmed by CT-guided or ultrasound-guided core-needle biopsy once a chest CT has excluded spread to lungs. Fluorodeoxyglucose-positron emission tomography is more accurate than a bone scan in detecting spread, and can be used to monitor response to treatment.

Treatment
Chemotherapy and surgical removal are options if the tumor is localised. If it cannot be operated upon, radiation therapy may be effective.

Epidemiology
The tumor is rare. It accounts for around 12% of cases of Ewing sarcoma. It is 10 times less common than Ewing sarcoma of bone and occurs in around 1.4 per million people, with a greater likelihood in under five-year olds and over 35-year olds. There does not appear to be any association with ethnicity or gender.

History
The condition was first reported by Melvin Tefft in 1969.

References

Further reading

External links 

Osseous and chondromatous neoplasia
Sarcoma
Rare diseases